Sabanakovo (Habanaq) is a rural locality (a village) in Lemez-Tamaksky Selsoviet, Mechetlinsky District, Bashkortostan, Russia. The population was 391 as of 2010. There are 5 streets.

Geography 
Sabanakovois located 14 km south of Bolsheustyikinskoye (the district's administrative centre) by road. Ayupovo is the nearest rural locality.

References 

Rural localities in Mechetlinsky District